A carbon market in India was introduced through Energy Conservation (Amendment) Bill, 2022 to follow United Nations Climate Change Conference (COP26) as an attempt reduce fossil fuel consumption through use of non-fossil sources such as green hydrogen, green ammonia, biomass, and bioethanol as energy and feedstock.

Goals 

The government of India established a carbon market in India, improved the Code for Energy Conservation Building and helped to build the governing council of the Bureau of Energy Efficiency through increasing members. The bill aimed to make the use of non fossil fuel sources mandatory for energy and encourage feedstocks like green ammonia, green hydrogen, ethanol and biomass.

Benefits 

The carbon market in India seeks the following benefits:

 Improves agricultural practices and social communities through emission reductions to improve their source of income through the voluntary credit market.
 Helps in protecting coastal areas and improving agricultural productivity.
 Economic development projects for community and gender and conservation of biodiversity through voluntary credit markets using premium pricing.
 Providing an additional source of money for low-income households by upgrading cooking systems.

Features 

The carbon market in India includes multiple features:

 System of trading to buy and sell credits permitting an industrial unit to emit a specific amount of greenhouse gas.
 Compliance is voluntary.
 Credits are to be used in the domestic market instead of export.
 Clean energy can allow India to develop capacity as an energy exporter.

Challenges 

The mechanism of the carbon market in India can face challenges of corruption and environmental concerns. Implementation may take time and should be done in a phased manner.

See also 

 Carbon credit

References 

Carbon emissions
Carbon finance